Oberdürenbach is a municipality in the district of Ahrweiler, in Rhineland-Palatinate, Germany.

References 

Ahrweiler (district)